Season 1880–81 was the fourth in which Hibernian competed at a Scottish national level, entering the Scottish Cup for the fourth time.

Overview 

Hibs reached the third round of the Scottish Cup, losing 5–3 to Edinburgh derby rivals Hearts. The match was played in the Powderhall area of Edinburgh.

Results 

All results are written with Hibs' score first.

Scottish Cup

See also
List of Hibernian F.C. seasons

References

External links 
 Results For Season 1880/1881 in All Competitions, www.ihibs.co.uk

Hibernian F.C. seasons
Hibernian